Patriarch John VI may refer to:

 Patriarch John VI of Constantinople, ruled in 712–715
 Patriarch John VI of Alexandria, Greek Patriarch of Alexandria in 1062–1100
 Patriarch John VI of Antioch, a designation contended among various people; see John of Antioch
 John VI, various Maronite Patriarchs